The 2001 Dubai World Cup was a horse race held at Nad Al Sheba Racecourse on Saturday 24 March 2001. It was the 6th running of the Dubai World Cup.

The winner was Michael E. Pegram's Captain Steve, a four-year-old chestnut colt trained in the United States by Bob Baffert and ridden by Jerry Bailey. Captain Steve's victory was a third in the race for Bailey, a second for Baffert and a first for Pegram.

Captain Steve was one of the leading colts of his generation in the United States, winning the Hollywood Futurity in 1999 and the Swaps Stakes in 2000. Before being shipped to Dubai he won the Donn Handicap at Gulfstream Park on 3 February. In the 2001 Dubai World Cup he started the 7/4 joint-favourite and won by three lengths from the Japanese challenger To The Victory with the French-trained Hightori half a length away in third place. The other joint-favourite was the Godolphin runner Best of the Bests, who finished eighth of the twelve runners.

Race details
 Sponsor: none
 Purse: £4,000,000; First prize: £2,400,000
 Surface: Dirt
 Going: Fast
 Distance: 10 furlongs
 Number of runners: 12
 Winner's time: 2:00.40

Full result

 Abbreviations: DSQ = disqualified; nse = nose; nk = neck; shd = head; hd = head; nk = neck

Winner's details
Further details of the winner, Captain Steve
 Sex: Stallion
 Foaled: 11 March 1997
 Country: United States
 Sire: Fly So Free; Dam: Sparkling Delite (Vice Regent)
 Owner: Michael E. Pegram
 Breeder: Roger Laubach

References

Dubai World Cup
Dubai World Cup
Dubai World Cup
Dubai World Cup